This is a list of listed buildings in Jammerbugt Municipality, Denmark.

Listed buildings

9440 Aabybro

9460 Brovst

9492 Blokhus

9690 Fjerritslev

External links

 Danish Agency of Culture

References

 
Jammerbugt